Bansed is a village in Parbatsar tehsil in Nagaur District of Rajasthan.

Geography

Demographics

 India census, Bansed had a population of 1,459. Males constitute 741 of the population and females 718.

References

Villages in Nagaur district